Tõrvajõgi is a river in Ida-Viru County, Estonia. The river is 16.1 km long and basin size is 43.7 km2. It runs into Narva River.

The river has Tõrvajõgi Waterfall.

References

Rivers of Estonia
Ida-Viru County